The Anderson Outkitchen is located in Hackensack, Bergen County, New Jersey, United States. The outkitchen was added to the National Register of Historic Places on August 8, 1985.

See also
National Register of Historic Places listings in Bergen County, New Jersey

References

External links
 Google View of Anderson Outkitchen

Hackensack, New Jersey
Buildings and structures in Bergen County, New Jersey
National Register of Historic Places in Bergen County, New Jersey
New Jersey Register of Historic Places